MDG is an abbreviation for Millennium Development Goals.

MDG, or mdg, may also refer to: 

 Malaysian Dreamgirl, an online reality television program
 MDG, the IATA code for Mudanjiang Hailang Airport in Heilongjiang Province, China
 MDG, the ISO, ITU and NATO code for Madagascar, a sovereign state and island country
 MDG, the National Rail code for Midgham railway station in the county of Berkshire, UK
 Miljøpartiet De Grønne, the Green Party of Norway
Monocable Detachable Gondola; cf. Aerial lift#Abbreviations
 Musikproduktion Dabringhaus und Grimm, German classical recording company

See also 
 Gotland Naval District (Gotlands marindistrikt)
 Gotland Military District (Gotlands militärdistrikt)